Dow Jones average may refer to:

 Dow Jones Industrial Average
 Dow Jones Transportation Average
 Dow Jones Utility Average
 Dow Jones Composite Average